The Korfball event at the World Games 2013 took place at the Iván Vassilev Todorov Arena (Cauca Valley University Coliseum), a sport arena in Cali purpose built for Korfball, from Wednesday, July 31 to Sunday, August 4, 2013.

Teams

Pool matches

Semifinals
5th-8th places

Semifinals

Finals

Final standings

External links
 

2013 World Games
2013
2013 in korfball
Korfball in Colombia